Echad Ha'am 101 is an Israeli sitcom and spin-off of the series Echad Ha'am 1, which was broadcast in Israeli channel 2 in 2003.

The first episode of Echad Ha'am 101 was broadcast on July 5, 2010.

Plot
Echad Ha'am 101 tells the story of Miri Paskal, an edgy, a bit insane parking inspector in Tel Aviv. After her husband, Ruben, was killed in an accident during rehearsal for Germany war victims' ceremony, Miri gets a very large amount of money, from Ruben's inheritance, and decides to move from her small tenement in Ramat Gan to a luxury tower in Tel Aviv.

Meanwhile, her daughter, Yafit, gets pregnant and quickly gets married toYaron, who is her boss in a hot dog restaurant. While Miri gets busy with her new rich life, she slowly forgets her old loved friends.

External links
Echad Ha'am 101 Official site at Reshet

References

Israeli television sitcoms
2010 Israeli television series debuts
2010 Israeli television series endings